Aojia Town is a village and town in Qianwei County, Leshan City, Sichuan, China. It has an area of 48.1 square kilometers.

Villages
The jurisdiction of Aojia Town includes 14 villages:
Caihua
Cotton
Guangguang
Guiping
Healthy
Linfeng
Longfeng
Qingshan
Shiba
Shuijing
Weigan
Weixing
Xianfeng
Xianjin

See also 
 List of township-level divisions of Sichuan

References 

Qianwei County
Towns in Sichuan